The 2014–15 Turkish Airlines Euroleague was the 15th season of the modern era of Euroleague Basketball and the fifth under the title sponsorship of the Turkish Airlines. Including the competition's previous iteration as the FIBA Europe Champions Cup, this was the 58th season of the premier competition for European men's clubs.

The city of Madrid hosted the Final Four from May 15 to 17, 2015.

Allocation
There were three routes to participation in the Euroleague:

 The 12 teams with an A-Licence from the 2013–14 Euroleague, based on their Euroleague Club Ranking.
 The 2013–14 Eurocup winner was given a C-Licence.
 The rest of the teams places were allocated from a list of 28 teams given a B-Licence ranked according to their European national basketball league rankings over the last year. 13 teams were given both an A-Licence or C-Licence and a B-Licence. When a country ranking spot had already been assigned to an A-Licence team, the assignation jumped to the next country appearing in the ranking, and their league was not granted an additional place in the competition. At least the first 9 of the remaining 16 teams were given places in the regular-season, and the next 6 were given places in the qualifying competition.
 If the Eurocup champion was qualified by receiving a B licence or some team with it resigned from the competition, a wild card had to be given by the Euroleague.

The Euroleague had the right to cancel an A licence for one of the following reasons: 
The club had the lowest ranking of all clubs with an A Licence, according to the Club Ranking.
The club had ranked among the clubs placed in the bottom half of the national championship final standings.
The club had financial problems.
In Spanish League, when the champion and/or the runner-up of the league were teams without an A licence. In that case, the A licence club with the lowest position would play in Eurocup in the next season. If that happened three times in five years, the A licence of the club would have been cancelled.

Euroleague allocation criteria

A licences
Classification after the 2013–14 Euroleague, including also the 2011–12 and the 2012–13 seasons.

 The A licence of EA7 Milano expired in June 2014, but Euroleague confirmed it as an A licensed team.
 Montepaschi Siena did not play in the Euroleague, due to financial troubles.

B licences
B licences could be given to every team without an A licence. If in the allocation appeared a team with A licence, the next team in the criteria would receive the B licence, which qualified directly to the Regular Season.

C licence, replacements and wildcards
To the regular season
 Valencia (C licence as 2013–14 Eurocup winner)
 Alba Berlin (one-year wildcard which substituted Asseco Prokom's A-Licence removed in 2013)
 Dinamo Sassari (one-year wildcard which substituted Montepaschi Siena's A-licence, after it resigned in 2014)
 Crvena Zvezda (one-year wildcard which substituted Cibona's B-licence)
To the qualifying rounds
 UNICS (as 2013–14 VTB League best qualified without A or B licence)
 Hapoel Jerusalem (wildcard)
 ASVEL (wildcard)
 VEF Rīga (wildcard after the rejection of Levski Sofia)

Teams
The participating teams for the season were announced on June 25, 2014. The labels in the parentheses show how each team qualified for the place of its starting round (TH: Euroleague title holders):
A: Qualified through an A–licence
1st, 2nd, etc.: League position after Playoffs
QR: Qualifying rounds
WC: Wild card
EC: Champion of the 2013–14 Eurocup

Qualifying rounds

Eight teams participated in a single-venue tournament format that took place in Ostend, Belgium, from 23 to 26 September. The winner advanced to the Euroleague regular season.

Squads

Draw
Teams were seeded into six pots of four teams in accordance with the Club Ranking, based on their performance in European competitions during a three-year period.

Two teams from the same country or league could not be drawn together in the same Regular Season group. In brackets, the points in the Club Ranking. Following the Eurocup bylaws, the lowest possible position that any club from that country or league could occupy in the draw was calculated by adding the results of the worst performing team from each league.

Regular season

The regular season was played between October 16 and December 19.

If teams were level on record at the end of the Regular Season, tiebreakers were applied in the following order:
 Head-to-head record.
 Head-to-head point differential.
 Point differential during the Regular Season.
 Points scored during the regular season.
 Sum of quotients of points scored and points allowed in each Regular Season game.

Group A

Group B

Group C

Group D

Top 16

The Top 16 began on December 30 and ended on April 10, 2015.

If teams were level on record at the end of the Top 16, tiebreakers were applied in the following order:

 Head-to-head record between teams still tied.
 Head-to-head point differential.
 Point differential during the Top 16.
 Points scored during the Top 16.
 Sum of quotients of points scored and points allowed in each Top 16 game.

See the detailed group stage page for tiebreakers if two or more teams are equal on points.

Group E

Group F

Quarterfinals

Final Four

The Final Four was the last stage of the Euroleague, consisting of the four winners from the quarterfinals. The semifinal games were played on 15 May, while the third place game and championship game were played on 17 May 2015. The Final Four was hosted by the Barclaycard Center in Madrid, Spain.

Attendances

Average home attendances

Top 10

Individual statistics

Rating

Points

Rebounds

Assists

Other statistics

Game highs

Awards

Euroleague MVP 
  Nemanja Bjelica ( Fenerbahçe Ülker)

Euroleague Final Four MVP 
  Andrés Nocioni ( Real Madrid)

All-Euroleague Teams

Top Scorer (Alphonso Ford Trophy)
  Taylor Rochestie (  Nizhny Novgorod)

Best Defender
  Bryant Dunston ( Olympiacos)

Rising Star
  Bogdan Bogdanović ( Fenerbahçe Ülker)

MVP of the Week

Regular season

Top 16

Quarter-finals

MVP of the Month

See also 
2014–15 Eurocup Basketball
2014–15 EuroChallenge

References

 
EuroLeague seasons